A chaise longue ("long chair") is an upholstered sofa in the shape of a chair that is long enough to support the legs of the sitter.

In modern French the term chaise longue can refer to any long reclining chair such as a deckchair. A literal translation in English is "long chair". The term chaise lounge, used since (1800) is corruption of French chaise longue "long chair," with French word order; the second word confused in English with lounge. 

An alternative spelling for the chaise (chair) is chaise lounge and pronounced , a folk etymology replacement of part of the original French term with the unrelated English word lounge.  When English speakers imported a new kind of sofa from France in the late 1700s, they transformed the name 'chaise longue' ("long chair") into 'chaise lounge'—since 'lounge' is an English word spelled with the same letters and lounging is something one can do on a "chaise longue." The use of the alternative spelling, namely, chaise lounge has been documented both in British texts since at least 1811 and in American texts since 1824.

Origins
The modern chaise longue was first popularised during the 16th century in France. They were created by French furniture craftsmen for the rich to rest without the need to retire to the bedroom. It was during the Rococo period that the chaise longue became the symbol of social status and only the rarest and most expensive materials were used in their construction. Today, the chaise longue is seen as a luxury item for the modern home. They are often used to complement a home's décor such as living or reading rooms, or as a stylish boudoir chair for bedroom seating.

  (French: 'Broken duchess'): this word is used when the chaise longue is divided in two parts: the chair and a long footstool, or two chairs with a stool in between them. The origin of the name is unknown.
 : a récamier has two raised ends, and nothing on the long sides. It is sometimes associated with French Empire (neo-classical) style. It is named after French society hostess Madame Récamier (1777–1849), who posed elegantly on a couch of this kind for a portrait, painted in 1800 by Jacques-Louis David. The shape of the récamier is similar to a traditional  (boat bed) but made for the drawing room, not the bedroom.
 : a méridienne has a high head-rest, and a lower foot-rest, joined by a sloping piece. Whether or not they have anything at the foot end, méridiennes are asymmetrical day-beds. They were popular in the grand houses of France in the early 19th century. Its name is from its typical use: rest in the middle of the day, when the sun is near the meridian.

Psychoanalysis

The chaise longue has traditionally been associated with psychoanalysis. Sigmund Freud initiated the use of the chaise longue for this purpose, the idea being that the patient would recline on a couch, with the analyst seated beyond the head of the couch, so that the client would not see the analyst. Reclining and not having to face the analyst was thought to be disinhibiting and to encourage free association. At the time Freud began to use the chaise longue, it was considered daring in Vienna to recline on a chaise in the presence of non-intimates. Freud's own chaise longue, given to him by a patient, may be seen today at the Freud Museum in London.  

Today, psychoanalysts continue to invite clients to recline on couches in their offices during psychotherapy, and may use chaises longues rather than more conventional styles of couch out of tradition. The chaise longue is commonly used as visual shorthand to suggest a generic psychotherapist's office in cartoons and other works.

See also

 Couch
 Eames Lounge Chair
 Fainting couch
 Sunlounger

References

External links

 

Chairs
Couches
Furniture
Upholstery
Psychoanalysis